The Archdeacon of Lothian was the head of the Archdeaconry of Lothian, a sub-division of the Diocese of St Andrews. The position was one of the most important positions within the medieval Scottish church; because of his area's large population and high number of parish churches, the Archdeacon of Lothian may have exercised more power than many Scottish bishops before the decline in archdiaconal powers after the 13th century.

List of Archdeacons of Lothian
 Thorald, 1144-1165
 Andrew, 1165-1179 x 1184
 William de Malveisin, 1189 x 1194-1199
 John de Leicester, 1200-1212
 William de Bosco, 1214-1231
 William de Bondington, x 1233
 William de Maule, 1235-1251
 Thomas de Carnoto (or Charteris), 1260 x 1262-1267
 Robert Wishart, 1267 x 1271-1273
 Adam de Gullane, 1282
 William Frere, 1285-1306
 William de Eaglesham, 1317-1323
 Alexander de Kininmund, 1327-1329
 William Comyn, 1329-1336 x 1337
 John de Douglas, 1336 x 1337
 Walter de Moffat, 1340 x 1341-1357 x 1359
 Walter de Wardlaw, 1357 x 1359-1367
 David de Mar, 1367-1382
 Duncan Petit, 1380
 Thomas de Barry, 1382
 Walter Forrester, 1386
 James Borthwick, 1390-1408
 John Stewart, x 1405
 William de Lawedre (Lauder), 1405 -1408
 Alexander de Lilliesleaf, x 1408
 Richard de Cornell, 1408 -1419
 John Derling (Devlyn), 1409
 Columba de Dunbar, 1419-1422
 William Croyser, 1419
 Edward de Lauder, 1419-1429/30
 David de Crannach, x 1429/30
 Thomas de Greenlaw, 1430-1431
 Gilbert Forrester, 1431
 Alexander de Newton, 1431-1433
 William Croyser 1433 - bef. Aug 1440 (deprived)
 John de Lawedre (Lauder)(d.1474), bef. July 1443 – 1452/3
 William Croyser (d.1468), 1452 x 1453 - 1460 x 1461(7)
 James Lindsay (de Covington ?), 1461-1468/9
 Nicholas Graham, 1469-1469 x 1470
 William Ferguson, 1470
 Robert Blackadder, 1470-1472
 Archibald Whitelaw, 1470-1498
 Alexander Gisford, 1494-1507
 David Arnot, 1498-1503
 John Brady, 1505-1525
 Henry Forsyth, 1525 x 1530/1
 John Hay, 1531
 Patrick Stewart, 1532-1539 x 1542.
 Walter Betoun, 1546-1554
 Alexander Betoun, 1548-1584

Notes

Bibliography
 Lawrie, Sir Archibald, Early Scottish Charters Prior to A.D. 1153, (Glasgow, 1905)
 Watt, D.E.R., Fasti Ecclesiae Scotinanae Medii Aevi ad annum 1638, 2nd Draft, (St Andrews, 1969), pp. 309–14

See also
 Archdeacon of St Andrews
 Bishop of St Andrews

Lothian
Lothian